Sarenza is a French e-Commerce company specializing in the online sale of shoes and accessories. Based in Paris, Sarenza offers a selection of hundreds of different brands and tens of thousands of styles.
Created in 2005 by Francis Lelong, Yoan Le Berrigaud, Frank Zayan, today the company is directed by Stéphane Treppoz and Hélène Boulet-Supau and employs more than 200 people as of 2014.
Sarenza developed in France before expanding throughout Europe starting in 2009.
As of 2014, Sarenza delivers to 26 European countries and has opened several sites dedicated to certain countries, including the UK, Spain, Italy, Germany, Sweden, Denmark, Poland and The Netherlands.

History 
Sarenza was created in September 2005 with the launch of the French website www.sarenza.com. The company grew thanks to two successful investments totaling six million euros and decided to focus on international expansion.

Sarenza was restructured in March 2007 when the three cofounders left the company. Stéphane Treppoz then became the president of Sarenza, and Hélène Boulet-Supau became the managing director. They raised three million Euros to continue the company's growth. and maintain its lead position in the market with a new, automatic warehouse near Paris, an internal customer service department, and revised business techniques. One year and a half after the direction change, the company was already profitable.

A new investment of three million Euros was granted in April 2009 to finance Sarenza's international development. Two-thirds of this investment came from personal funds given by Stéphane Treppoz and Hélène Boulet-Supau.
On 7 April 2010 at 8:13 p.m, Sarenza.com sold its millionth pair of shoes.
In December 2011, Stéphane Treppoz, CEO of Sarenza and Hélène Boulet-Supau, managing director, acquired complete control of Sarenza. At the end of this negotiation, the Sarenza direction controle over 80% of the company's capital.
In the beginning of 2012, Sarenza became one of the top 15 e-commerce sites the most visited in France, published by FEVAD(Fédération d’e-commerce et vente à distance) and Médiamétrie with 3.8 million unique visitors on average per month during the 1st quarter of 2012.

In June 2014, Sarenza received an investment of 74 million Euros to increase its international expansion, the largest investment in French e-commerce history to that date. The funds were primarily given by the French Public Investment Bank, the BPI.

Sarenza begins international expansion 
The first international opening in October 2009 was the British website for customers living in the United Kingdom. The Italian and German websites followed in December 2010. Then, in the first trimester of 2011, Sarenza arrived in Spain and the Netherlands. In March 2012, a new wave of openings occurred with the launch of the Polish website and the European website, permitting delivery to numerous countries in northern and eastern Europe.

Key figures 
In 2010, Sarenza achieved a revenue of 80 million Euros, four times the revenue of 2008 and 20 times the revenue of 2006.
In 2011, Sarenza reached over 100 million Euros in revenue.

Items 
In June 2012, Sarenza passed the mark of six million items sold since its creation.
Sarenza stocks over one million items in its 18,000 m2 warehouse (as of 2014).

Business Model 
Sarenza is the first French "pure player" shoe retailer based on the model of the American company Zappos, the largest online shoe retailer in the world.
The concept has remained the same since Sarenza's creation: the strategy is based on the selection (with over 650 brands and 45,000 styles of shoes and accessories offered for men, women, and children) and customer service:
Free delivery and returns with no minimum spend amount via Hermes
100 days to exchange or return an item for free

Infrastructure 
Sarenza's headquarters and offices are located in the center of Paris. All orders delivered to France and throughout Europe are shipped from the warehouse in Réau, which is managed by XPO Logistics, Sarenza's logistics partner since 2016.

Prizes and recognition 
Sarenza has received numerous awards since its creation. The most recent include: 
 The prize of "Best fashion website" during the 5th "Nuit des Favori", or "Night of favorites", organized by FEVAD at the end of 2011 
 The "Great Place to Work" ranking in January 2012 and the "Jury favorite" prize from FEVAD also in 2012.  
Its first international prize,"Best foreign website" in the Madrid e-Commerce Awards in 2012 
 "Best international online store" in September 2012 during the e-Awards Duo in Madrid 
 "Best online fashion site" by FEVAD in France in November 2012

Notes and references

External links 
  Sarenza UK website.

Retail companies of France
Companies based in Paris
Retail companies established in 2005